The clown featherback, clown knifefish,  or spotted knifefish, Chitala ornata, is a nocturnal tropical fish with a long, knife-like body. This knifefish is native to freshwater habitats in Cambodia, Laos, Thailand, and Vietnam, but it has also been introduced to regions outside its native range. It is one of the world's most invasive species.

It is often seen in aquaculture and the aquarium trade, where it is frequently confused with Chitala chitala; the latter species is very rare in the aquarium trade. The clown featherback reaches  in length, outgrowing all but the largest aquaria, yet it is popular.

Distribution
This species is native to Cambodia, Laos, Thailand, and Vietnam, where found in the Mekong, Chao Phraya, and Meklong River basins. It has also been introduced to regions outside its native range, including the Philippines, Indonesia,  Myanmar, Singapore, Sri Lanka, Malaysia and Palm Beach County, Florida, United States. It has either spread to or was introduced to Broward County, Florida.

Appearance

The clown knifefish is very distinct, with normally silvery gray with a long, knife-like body (laterally compressed) and a long anal fin that gives it its common name. Mature fish normally have five to 10 (or even more) black spots ringed with white that usually decrease in size as the fish grows. These ocellated spots and the lack of faint stripes on the back separate it from Chitala chitala; a species with which it frequently has been confused. Albinos and leucistic specimens are seen with some frequency in the aquarium trade.

Juveniles lack the spots, but are overall striped. Their long anal fins are used to make graceful forward and backward movements.

It has two nasal tentacles above its large, toothed mouth. In the center of the body is a flag-like dorsal fin and has no ventral fins.

Behavior
They are nocturnal and usually cruise during the twilight hours. They normally hunt live prey and try any fish that fits into their mouths. Young clown knifefish usually school near water logs and plants for security, whereas more mature specimens usually become territorial and eventually become loners. These fish can also breathe air to survive in stagnant waters and little oxygen. These fish usually are found in lakes, swamps, and river backwaters.

In the aquarium
Clown knifefish are sold as exotic fish in pet stores, but they grow much too large for the average home aquarium. 
These fish have periods of retreat, so aquaria that have caves, plants, or other hiding places are preferred. They are jumpers, so the lid should be kept tightly closed. Dim lighting may help lessen jumping. For the first few days, clown knifefish are shy and prone to hiding. As they grow larger, they tend to be quite the opposite.

Feeding
Clown knifefish are hearty eaters, and will take live foods such as feeder fish, ghost shrimp, and blackworms. With time, they can be adapted to foods such as beefheart and will sometimes learn to accept commercial food pellets. They are mostly nocturnal, thus prefer feeding when the lights are off.

As food
The clown featherback is commonly seen in the cuisine of Thailand and other Southeast Asian countries. In Thailand, when deep-fried as pla krai thot krathiam (ปลากรายทอดกระเทียม), it is served with a spicy dipping sauce on the side made by mashing up coriander roots, bird's eye chillies, and garlic, and mixing this with fish sauce, lime juice, and sugar. The clown featherback is also the main fish used in the production of fish balls.

See also
Bronze featherback
List of freshwater aquarium fish species
List of Thai ingredients

References
 
 http://www.myfwc.com/WILDLIFEHABITATS/Nonnative_FW_ClownKnifefish.htm – accessed October 2006
 http://badmanstropicalfish.com/profiles/profile5.html - accessed October 2006
 http://www.aqualandpetsplus.com/Knife,%20Clown.htm

External links

Chitala
Fish of Cambodia
Fish of Laos
Fish of Thailand
Fish of Vietnam
Fish described in 1831
Taxa named by John Edward Gray